"Chicken Reel" is a dance tune. It was composed and published in 1910 by Joseph M. (Michael) Daly (1883–1968), with copyright registered on October 7. Joseph Mittenthal added lyrics three months later, and the texted version was copyrighted on January 12, 1911.

Along with "Turkey in the Straw," "Chicken Reel" is probably one of the best-known poultry-related folk tunes. It is frequently found in early animated cartoons as a catchy tune used to represent farmyard activity, or a gathering of fowl.  Originally composed as a novelty song, it has since passed into modern folk tradition.  Today, the tune is usually played without the words, which would often have been sung in the minstrel style (in stereotyped African-American vernacular).

Chicken Reel was made popular again years later by Les Paul who recorded the song as a catchy instrumental, whimsically mimicking chicken sounds on his guitar.

"Chicken Reel" was arranged for symphony orchestra by Leroy Anderson; his arrangement was recorded by Arthur Fiedler and the Boston Pops Orchestra in 1962. It also inspired Jean Wiener's Histoires sans paroles.

Lyrics 
The lyrics as written by Mittenthal:

Popular culture
Chicken Reel usually introduces the chicken yard scene in many Foghorn Leghorn cartoons.

It's also the theme song to the recurring game Astro Chicken in the Space Quest line of graphic adventure games.

A spirited arrangement of Chicken Reel for fiddle and Jew's harp is featured in A Christmas Story when the Bumpus family's bloodhounds swarm Ralphie's father as he arrives home from work.

Notes

References 
Daly, Joseph M. (m.). "Chicken Reel" (Sheet music). Boston: Daly Music Publisher (1910).
Mittenthal, Joseph (w.); Daly, Joseph M. (m.). "Chicken Reel" (Sheet music). Boston: Daly Music Publisher (1911).

External links 
"Chicken Reel", Edward Meeker (Edison Blue Amberol 2347, 1914)—Cylinder Preservation and Digitization Project. 
Digitized sheet music from the original 1910 Publication.

American folk songs
Novelty and fad dances
1910 songs